is a Japanese professional female mixed martial artist. Starting her MMA career in 2006,
She has participated in the organizations Pancrase, Smackgirl, Valkyrie and the UFC.

Nakai has been rated amongst Top 10 of Women's Flyweight and Bantamweight fighters between 2006 and 2018.

Biography
Nakai was born on October 22, 1986 in Matsuyama, Ehime Prefecture. She started training in judo at the age of three. She was ranked #5 in judo in all of Japan in middle school and #3 in senior high school. She graduated from Takanawadai High School (a Middle School attached to Tokai University) and later dropped out of Teikyo University.

Early MMA
Nakai started fighting on October 1, 2006.  She defeated Asuka Ito by TKO (technical knockout), after breaking Ito's nose at Pancrase 2006 Blow Tour.

Smackgirl
On May 19, 2007, she fought against Kazue Matake in her first fight for the Smackgirl promotion and won the decision.

On September 6, 2007, she fought against Asha Ingeneri in Smackgirl and defeated her on round one, at 1 minute 3 seconds with an armbar.

On April 25, 2008, she defeated Kanako Takeshita at her final fight for the Smackgirl promotion.

Valkyrie
On December 7, 2008, she fought against WINDY Tomomi at the 4th "Pancrase-ism"-sponsored event and won by TKO with a mounted punch.

Nakai had a year and two month-long gap before her next fight. On February 11, 2010, she played against Mizuho Sato at VALKYRIE 04, which was her first fight for the VALKYRIE promotion, and won by Kimura Lock.

On June 19, 2010, she fought against Megumi Yabushita at VALKYRIE 06 and won a 3-0 decision.

On September 26, 2010, she fought against Mayumi Aoki in the semi-final of the women's open-weight class first champion decision tournament of VALKYRIE 07, and won with a armbar.

On November 28, 2010, she faced-off again with Mizuho Sato in the women's open-weight first championship tournament final of VALKYRIE 08.
Nakai defeated Sato by Doctor Stoppage, when it was suspected that Sato had fractured of the orbital floor of her left eye. This win also earned Nakai the Valkyrie tournament win.

On December 30, 2010, in the VALKYRIE-sponsored match of the "Battlefield - Soul of Fight" event held at the Ariake Coliseum, she fought Mika "HARI" Harigai and won by Keylock submission. This extended Nakai's winning streak from her debut to 10 and this achievement landed her on the front page of Tokyo Chunichi Sports the following day.

Return to Pancrase
On September 4, 2011, Nakai fought Danielle West to a split-decision draw at "Pancrase - Impressive Tour 9". On December 1, 2012, Nakai would rematch  Danielle West at "Pancrase - Progress Tour 14", with Nakai this time defeating West by unanimous decision.

Nakai returned to Pancrase on May 20, 2012, defeating Kyoko Kimura via submission due to an armbar at Pancrase Progress Tour 6.

Nakai faced Mayumi Aoki in a rematch at Pancrase Progress Tour 10 on September 1, 2012. The fight was part of the opening round of the bantamweight Queen of Pancrase tournament. Nakai defeated Aoki by TKO in the second round.

On December 1, 2012, Nakai faced Danielle West in a rematch for the bantamweight Queen of Pancrase title at Pancrase Progress Tour 14. She defeated West by unanimous decision to become the first bantamweight Queen of Pancrase. There was a good deal of controversy surrounding the bout however, as some journalists, and observers accused Pancrase of "fixing" the match. West came in 1 kg heavy for the fight and as a result Pancrase officials made her cut weight a second time on the day of the fight to prevent her from re-hydrating. Beyond a second weight cut they also informed her that no knees or chokes would be allowed. However officials failed to inform West that the rule would only apply to her, Nakai would have no restrictions. West was only made fully aware of this discrepancy mid-fight. Following the fight West was also informed that even if she had won the contest it would have been declared a draw or no-decision.

On May 11, 2014, she fought against Sarah D'Alelio in Pancrase and won the decision.

She fought against Tara LaRosa in Pancrase on September 29, 2013, winning a 2-0 decision.

UFC
In 2014, Nakai made her move to the American UFC promotion. When Nakai began competing for the UFC, the organization did not have a women's flyweight division (-56.7 kg), so she had to compete at bantamweight (-61.2 kg). Her UFC debut took place at UFC Fight Night: Hunt vs. Nelson on September 20, 2014. Her opponent was Miesha Tate, who at the time was ranked second in the women's bantamweight rankings. Nakai would lose the fight by 0-3 decision and was the first loss in her MMA career. At UFC Fight Night: Hunt vs. Mir on March 19, 2016, she faced Leslie Smith and lost a 0-3 decision.

Post UFC
On July 24, 2016, she fought against Emiko Raika at Pancrase 279 and won by TKO with an elbow on the ground.

On September 29, 2016 Nakai competed at Rizin World Grand Prix 2016: 2nd Round . She defeated the decorated female wrestler Kanako Murata via 3rd round submission (Rear Naked Choke) to improve her record to 19-2.

On February 24, 2018, she made a comeback at DEEP 82 IMPACT for the first time in a year and two months. She fought against Kim Ji-young, taking the mount position and winning the TKO with a series of elbow strikes.

At Deep Jewels 24, Nakai faced Kaewjai Prachumwong, defeating her via TKO stoppage in the second round.

On October 22, 2019, she fought against Titapa Junsookplung (alias Diamond Rose the Rocket) at Deep Jewels 26 and defeated her with an armbar.

She fought Shoko Fujita in the Deep-Jewels Flyweight Grand Prix quarterfinal bout at Deep Jewels 36 on March 12, 2022., winning by TKO.

On May 8, 2022, she fought Tae Murayama in the DEEP JEWELS Flyweight Grand Prix semi-final held at Deep Jewels 37, winning by armbar in the second round. She advanced to the final on the same day, defeating Shizuka Sugiyama via armbar at the end of the first round, winning the Grand Prix, and becoming the first Deep Jewels Flyweight Champion.

Nakai faced Aoi Kuriyama on February 18, 2023 at Deep Jewels 40. She won the fight by a second-round submission.

Championships and accomplishments

VALKYRIE
 First VALKYRIE Open Weight Championship (2010)
Pancrase
 First Bantamweight Queen of Pancrase Championship (2012)
Fight Matrix
 Highest Quarterly Ranking: 1/01/2010, #2 Women Flyweight

Mixed martial arts record

 
|-
| Win
| align=center|26–2–1
| Aoi Kuriyama
| Submission (rear-naked choke)
| Deep Jewels 40
| 
| align=center| 2
| align=center| 4:31
| Tokyo, Japan
| 
|-
|Win
|align=center|25–2–1
|Shizuka Sugiyama
|Technical Submission (armbar)
|rowspan=2|Deep Jewels 37
|rowspan=2|
|align=center|1
|align=center|4:53
|rowspan=2|Tokyo, Japan
|
|-
|Win
|align=center|24–2–1
|Tae Murayama
|Technical Submission (armbar)
|align=center|2
|align=center|4:43
|
|-
| Win
| align=center| 23–2–1
| Shoko Fujita
| TKO (punches)
| Deep Jewels 36
| 
| align=center|2 
| align=center|4:38
| Tokyo, Japan
| 
|-
| Win
| align=center| 22–2–1
| Titapa Junsookplung
| Technical Submission (armbar)
| Deep Jewels 26
| 
| align=center| 1
| align=center| 3:20
| Tokyo, Japan
| 
|-
| Win
| align=center| 21–2–1
| Kaewjai Prachumwong
| TKO (punches)
| Deep Jewels 24
| 
| align=center| 2
| align=center| 1:56
| Tokyo, Japan
| 
|-
| Win
| align=center| 20–2–1
| Young Ji Kim
| TKO (elbows)
| DEEP 82 Impact
| 
| align=center| 1
| align=center| 4:37
| Tokyo, Japan
| 
|-
| Win
| align=center| 19–2–1
|Kanako Murata
| Submission (rear-naked choke)
| Rizin World Grand Prix 2016: 2nd Round 
|  
| align=center| 3
| align=center| 1:16
| Saitama, Japan
|
|-
| Win
| align=center| 18–2–1
| Charlene Watt
| TKO (punches)
| Pancrase 282
| 
| align=center| 2
| align=center| 3:43
| Tokyo, Japan
| 
|-
| Win
| align=center| 17–2–1
|Raika Emiko
|TKO (elbows)
|Pancrase 279
|
|align=center|3
|align=center|2:43
|Tokyo, Japan
| 
|-
| Loss
| align=center| 16–2–1
| Leslie Smith
|Decision (unanimous)
|UFC Fight Night: Hunt vs. Mir
|
|align=center|3
|align=center|5:00
|Brisbane, Australia
| 
|-
| Loss
| align=center| 16–1–1
| Miesha Tate
| Decision (unanimous)
| UFC Fight Night: Hunt vs. Nelson
| 
| align=center| 3
| align=center| 5:00
| Saitama, Japan
| 
|-
| Win
| align=center| 16–0–1
| Sarah D'Alelio
| Decision (unanimous)
| Pancrase 258
| 
| align=center | 3
| align=center | 5:00
| Tokyo, Japan
| 
|-
| Win
| align=center| 15–0–1
| Tara LaRosa
| Decision (majority)
| Pancrase 252: 20th Anniversary
| 
| align=center| 3
| align=center| 5:00
| Yokohama, Japan
| 
|-
| Win
| align=center| 14–0–1
|Brenda Gonzales
|Submission (rear-naked choke)
|Pancrase 247
|
|align=center|1
|align=center|4:47
| Tokyo, Japan
|
|-
| Win
| align=center| 13–0–1
| Danielle West
| Decision (unanimous)
| Pancrase Progress Tour 14
| 
| align=center| 3
| align=center| 5:00
| Tokyo, Japan
|
|-
| Win
| align=center| 12–0–1
| Mayumi Aoki
| TKO (punches)
| Pancrase Progress Tour 10
| 
| align=center| 2
| align=center| 3:45
| Tokyo, Japan
|
|-
| Win
| align=center| 11–0–1
| Kyoko Kimura
| Technical Submission (armbar)
| Pancrase Progress Tour 6
| 
| align=center| 1
| align=center| 4:32
| Okinawa, Japan
| 
|-
| Draw
| align=center| 10–0–1
| Danielle West
| Draw (split)
| Pancrase Impressive Tour 9
| 
| align=center| 3
| align=center| 5:00
| Tokyo, Japan
| 
|-
| Win
| align=center| 10–0
| Mika Harigai
| Submission (keylock)
| Sengoku 16
| 
| align=center| 1
| align=center| 2:09
| Tokyo, Japan
| 
|-
| Win
| align=center| 9–0
|Mizuho Sato
|TKO (doctor stoppage)
|VALKYRIE 08
|
|align=center|1
|align=center|5:00
|Tokyo, Japan
|
|-
| Win
| align=center| 8–0
| Mayumi Aoki
| Submission (armbar)
| VALKYRIE 07
| 
| align=center| 1
| align=center| 2:40
| Tokyo, Japan
| 
|-
| Win
| align=center| 7–0
| Megumi Yabushita
| Decision (unanimous)
| Valkyrie 06
| 
| align=center| 3
| align=center| 3:00
| Tokyo, Japan
| 
|-
| Win
| align=center| 6–0
| Mizuho Sato
| Submission (kimura)
| VALKYRIE 04
| 
| align=center| 1
| align=center| 1:56
| Tokyo, Japan
| 
|-
| Win
| align=center| 5–0
| Tomomi Sunaba
| TKO (punches)
| Pancrase 196
| 
| align=center| 1
| align=center| 1:33
| Tokyo, Japan
| 
|-
| Win
| align=center| 4–0
| Kanako Takeshita
| Decision (split)
| Smackgirl: World ReMix 2008 Second Round
| 
| align=center| 2
| align=center| 5:00
| Tokyo, Japan
| 
|-
| Win
| align=center| 3–0
| Asha Ingeneri
| Submission (armbar)
| Smackgirl: Queens' Hottest Summer
| 
| align=center| 1
| align=center| 1:03
| Tokyo, Japan
| 
|-
| Win
| align=center| 2–0
| Kazue Matake
| Decision (unanimous)
| Smackgirl: The Queen Said the USA is Strongest
| 
| align=center|2
| align=center|5:00
| Tokyo, Japan
| 
|-
| Win
| align=center| 1–0
| Asuka Ito
| TKO (doctor stoppage)
| Pancrase 167
| 
| align=center|1
| align=center|1:25
| Osaka, Japan
| 
|-

References

External links
Profile  at Fightergirls.com
Profile at Pancrase 
 
Official blog 
Official blog (old) 
Professional MMA record for Rin Nakai at Sherdog

1986 births
Japanese female mixed martial artists
Sportspeople from Ehime Prefecture
Ultimate Fighting Championship female fighters
Living people